The 1977 Colorado Buffaloes football team represented the University of Colorado Boulder in the Big Eight Conference during the 1977 NCAA Division I football season.

Colorado was a defending conference co-champion and won its first five games to reach third in the polls in October, its highest rank in five years. A disappointing  finish knocked them out of a bowl berth.

Schedule

Roster

References

External links
University of Colorado Athletics – 1977 football roster
Sports-Reference – 1977 Colorado Buffaloes

Colorado
Colorado Buffaloes football seasons
Colorado Buffaloes football